Siplase Nature Reserve is a nature reserve which is located in Saare County, Estonia.

The protected area was founded in 2007 to protect valuable habitat types and threatened species in Iide, Mõisaküla and Soodevahe village (all in former Torgu Parish).

References

Nature reserves in Estonia
Geography of Saare County